Studia Phaenomenologica is a peer-reviewed academic journal dedicated to the study of phenomenology and hermeneutics. It was established in 2001 by the Romanian Society for Phenomenology, and the founding editors-in-chief were Gabriel Cercel and Cristian Ciocan. The journal is currently published by Zeta Books. All issues are available online from the Philosophy Documentation Center.

Published issues 
 Volume 21 (2021) – From Witnessing to Testimony
Volume 20 (2020) – Phenomenology and the History of Platonism
Volume 19 (2019) – On Conflict and Violence
Volume 18 (2018) – The Promise of Genetic Phenomenology
Volume 17 (2017) – Phenomenology of Animality
 Volume 16 (2016) – Film and Phenomenology
 Volume 15 (2015) – Early Phenomenology
 Volume 14 (2014) – Place, Environment, Atmosphere
 Volume 13 (2013) – On the Proper Use of Phenomenology. Paul Ricoeur Centenary
 Volume 12 (2012) – Possibilities of Embodiment
 Volume 11 (2011) – Concepts of Tradition in Phenomenology
 Volume 10 (2010) – Phenomenology and Psychology
 Volume 9 (2009) – Michel Henry's Radical Phenomenology
 Volume 8 (2008) – Phenomenology and Literature
 Volume 7 (2007) – Jan Patočka and the European Heritage
 Volume 6 (2006) – A Century with Levinas. Notes on the Margins of his Legacy 
 Volume 5 (2012) – Translating Heidegger's Sein und Zeit
 Volume 4 issue 3–4 (2004) – The Ocean of Forgetting. Alexandru Dragomir: A Romanian Phenomenologist
 Volume 4 issue 1–2 (2004) – Issues on Brentano, Husserl and Heidegger
 Volume 3 Special Issue – Kunst und Wahrheit. Festschrift für Walter Biemel zu seinem 85. Geburtstag
 Volume 3 issue 3–4 (2003) – Maurice Merleau-Ponty: Chiasm and Logos
 Volume 3 issue 1–2 (2003) – The School of Brentano and Husserlian Phenomenology
 Volume 2 issue 3–4 (2002) – Issues on Husserl, Fink and Schutz
 Volume 2 issue 1–2 (2002) – In Memoriam: Hans-Georg Gadamer
 Volume 1 issue 3–4 (2001) – The Early Heidegger
 Volume 1 issue 1–2 (2001) – Heidegger and Theology

Abstracting and indexing 
Studia Phaenomenologica is abstracted and indexed in Academic Search, Arts & Humanities Citation Index, Central and Eastern European Online Library, Current Contents/Arts & Humanities, FRANCIS, Philosopher's Index, Répertoire bibliographique de la philosophie, and Scopus.

See also 
 List of philosophy journals

External links 
 

Publications established in 2001
Philosophy journals
Education in Romania
English-language journals
Philosophy Documentation Center academic journals